Afrig (died 4th century) was the Iranian founder of the Afrighid dynasty of Khwarazm. He is said to have built a fortress known as Fil or Fir near his capital in Kath. Not much more is known about him; he was later succeeded by his son Baghra.

References
 
 

4th-century deaths
4th-century births
4th-century Iranian people
Afrighids
Zoroastrian rulers